Line-crosser is a Dutch concept from World War II. The name is used to refer to 21 people, mostly from Werkendam, who during the last months of the war  maintained a secret connection between occupied and liberated Netherlands across the Biesbosch and the Merwede. They were part of the larger Biesbosch resistance group, and the Albrecht intelligence group.

History 
On 6 November 1944 the Biesbosch, a difficult to penetrate area, became the front between the German and allied forces. The Germans would almost never go into this area and as such it was ideal for hideouts for refugees.

Later that month it was decided to create a water crossing in the area between occupied and liberated Netherlands. Across two different routes people, goods, information and medicine were transported. In total 374 crossings were made. It was mostly a military intelligence route, but also Jews and stranded  pilots were helped. It is not known how many people were transported. One of the people who crossed was the British general John Hackett who had been wounded during Operation Market Garden. He would later describe his experiences in 1978 in the book 'I was a stranger'.

There were two main routes of 13 and 18 kilometers. Crossing were made in canoes or small boats, mostly rowed or with silent engines. At one of the places they used a raised basket next to a restaurant to indicate that a line-crosser was coming.

During the end of the war, after Dolle Dinsdag, several German troops deserted, mostly across "the bridge of saint Jan". These were often captured and at one point around 75 German soldiers were held for 8 weeks on boats in the area. These were later handed over to Polish allied forces who liberated the area.

List of line-crossers 
All 21 line-crosser were decorated after the war:

Military William Order 4th class 

 Arie van Driel, posthumously, he made 53 crossings
 Kees van de Sande, posthumously
 Jan de Landgraaf
 Cornelis Pieter van den Hoek. He made 37 crossings. Van den Hoek was the last living line-crosser, and member of the Military William Order.

Bronze Lion 

 Jacobus Bakker 
 Cornelis Leendert Bolijn
 Pieter van Dam 
 Desiderius Hubertus van Gool 
 Maria Catharina van Grunsven
 Jacobus Cornelis Hoevenaar 
 Franciscus Johannes Maria Hoffmans 
 Albert Kunst 
 Jacobus Meyer 
 Johannes Rombouts 
 Cornelis Visser 
 Jan Visser

Bronze Cross 

 Leendert Gerardus van Beugen
 Arie de Boon 
 Cornelis de Boon 
 Cor Hoekstra 
 Adriaan de Keijzer 
 Leendert van Kempen 
 Willem van Veen

Names of people transported 
People were transported both in and out of occupied Netherlands. Not many names are known. The following agents crossed from occupied into liberated territory:
 Theodorus Bernardus Bleeker
 Stephan Marie Claessens
 Dirk Dral
 Jan Willem van Driel
 Maria Catharina van Grunsven|Riet van Grunsven
 Ivan Brooks Hollomon, pilote
 Adriaan de Keizer

After the war

Reunions 

On Tuesday 4 December 1984 about 50 people of the Biesbosch resistance group meet. One of the people present was prince Bernhard of Lippe-Biesterfeld. There were commemorative meetings in 2010 and 2011.

Monuments 

On the bridge of saint Jan is a memorial text. There are several monuments dedicated to the Line-crossers, most prominently in Werkendam, Hank, Lage Zwaluwe and Sliedrecht.

References

Further reading 
 Biesbosch-Crossings 1944-1945, P. Hoek, 2000,

External links 
 Line crossers - Biesbosch.nu

1944 in the Netherlands
1945 in the Netherlands
Dutch resistance
History of North Brabant
Altena, North Brabant
Drimmelen